Jelena Dokic and Nadia Petrova were the two-time defending champions, but Dokic did not participate in the doubles event at this tournament. Petrova partnered Elena Likhovtseva, but the pair withdrew before their semifinal match against Marion Bartoli and Silvia Farina Elia.

Liezel Huber and Ai Sugiyama won the title, defeating Bartoli and Farina Elia in the final 6–1, 7–6(8–6).

Seeds

Draw

Draw

References
 Main Draw (ITF)

Generali Ladies Linz - Doubles